"Rapunzel" is a song recorded by Brazilian singer Daniela Mercury for her fourth studio album Feijão com Arroz. The song was considered one of the Brazilian themes of the 1998 FIFA World Cup.

Chart performance
The song reached No. 1 on the Brazilian music charts. The song also won a gold certification in France, selling more than 75,000 copies.

Formats and track listing
Brazil - CD single
 "Rapunzel" - 3:40

French - CD single
 "Rapunzel" (Radio Mix) - 3:40
 "Rapunzel" (Album Version) - 3:40

References

Daniela Mercury songs
1997 singles
1997 songs
Songs written by Carlinhos Brown
Epic Records singles